Cyclomilta melanolepia is a moth of the family Erebidae. It was described by Gerald C. Dudgeon in 1900. It is found in Sikkim, India.

References

Moths described in 1900
Erebid moths of Asia
Nudariina